Stéphane Roux may refer to:

 Stéphane Roux (actor)
 Stéphane Roux (comics)
 Stéphane Roux (physicist)